Axel Emanuel Eriksson (10 March 1884 – 20 December 1975) was a Swedish rower who competed in the 1912 and 1920 Summer Olympics. In 1912 he was a member of the Swedish boat Vaxholm that was eliminated in the first round of the coxed four competition. Eight years later he rowed with his younger brother Gösta as a coxswain, and they were again eliminated in the first round.

References

1884 births
1975 deaths
Swedish male rowers
Olympic rowers of Sweden
Rowers at the 1912 Summer Olympics
Rowers at the 1920 Summer Olympics